Ian Keith (born Keith Ross; February 27, 1899 – March 26, 1960) was an American actor.

Early years
Born in Boston, Massachusetts, Keith grew up in Chicago. He was educated at the Francis Parker School there and played Hamlet in a school production at age 16.

Career 
Keith was a veteran character actor of the stage, and appeared in a variety of colorful roles in silent features of the 1920s. 

In 1919, as Keith Ross, he acted with the Copley Repertory Theatre in Boston. On Broadway, as Ian Keith, he performed in The Andersonville Trial (1959), Edwin Booth (1958), Saint Joan (1956), Touchstone (1953), The Leading Lady (1948), A Woman's a Fool - to Be Clever (1938), Robin Landing (1937), King Richard II (1937), Best Sellers (1933), Hangman's Whip (1933), Firebird (1932), Queen Bee (1929), The Command Performance (1928), The Master of the Inn (1925), Laugh, Clown, Laugh! (1923), As You Like It (1923), The Czarina (1922), and The Silver Fox (1921).

He played John Wilkes Booth in D. W. Griffith's first sound film, Abraham Lincoln. Keith had a major role as a gambler in director Raoul Walsh's 1930 widescreen western The Big Trail starring John Wayne. In 1932, Cecil B. DeMille cast him in The Sign of the Cross. This established him as a dependable supporting player, and he went on to play dozens of roles—including Octavian (Augustus) in Cleopatra—in major and minor screen fare for the next three decades.

He became one of DeMille's favorites, appearing in many of the producer's epic films. He portrayed Count de Rochefort in both the 1935 version and the 1948 remake of The Three Musketeers.  In the 1940s he became even busier, working primarily in "B" features and westerns and alternating between playing good guys (a chief of detectives in The Payoff, a friendly hypnotist in Mr. Hex, a blowhard politician in She Gets Her Man) and bad guys (a murder suspect in The Chinese Cat, a crooked lawyer in Bowery Champs, a swindler in Singing on the Trail). He appeared in a supporting role to Tyrone Power in Nightmare Alley (1947) as a former vaudevillian turned carny who has succumbed to alcoholism.  He also had a definite flair for comedy, and his florid portrayal of the comic-strip ham actor "Vitamin Flintheart" in Dick Tracy vs. Cueball was so amusing that he repeated the role in two more films.

He played tough-guy military roles, such as Admiral Burns in Robert Gordon's sci-fi epic, It Came From Beneath the Sea (1955).

He also appeared on many television episodes in the 1950s, including starring in the premiere episode of The Nash Airflyte Theater in 1950. In 1955, he was seen on screen in his only Shakespeare role, when he made a cameo appearance as the Ghost opposite Richard Burton's Hamlet in a sequence from the Edwin Booth biopic Prince of Players. Cecil B. DeMille brought him back to the big screen for The Ten Commandments (1956); Keith played Ramses I.

Keith played Emmett Dayton in the radio soap opera Girl Alone.

Keith died in Medical Arts Hospital in New York on March 26, 1960, and was cremated in Hartsdale, New York.

Marriages
 Blanche Yurka (1922 - 1926)
 Ethel Clayton (1928 - 1931)
 Fern Andra (m. in 1932 and again in 1934, when the legality of the first ceremony was questioned; divorced; in 1938 Andra married again)
 Hildegarde Pabst (1936 - 1960)

Partial filmography

 Manhandled (1924) as Robert Brandt (film debut)
 Her Love Story (1924) as Captain Kavor
 Christine of the Hungry Heart (1924) as Ivan Vianney
 Love's Wilderness (1924) as Paul L'Estrange
 Enticement (1925) as Richard Valyran
 My Son (1925) as Felipe Vargas
 The Talker (1925) as Ned Hollister
 The Tower of Lies (1925) as  Lars
 The Greater Glory (1926) as Pauli Birbach
 The Lily (1926) as George Arnaud
 Prince of Tempters (1926) as Mario Ambrosio, later Baron Humberto Giordano
 The Truthful Sex (1926) as Tom Barnes
 The Love of Sunya (1927) as Louis Anthony
 What Every Girl Should Know (1927) as Arthur Graham
 Convoy (1927) as Smith
 Two Arabian Knights (1927) as Shevket
 A Man's Past (1927) as  Dr. Fontaine
 The Street of Illusion (1928) as Edwin Booth Benton
 The Lookout Girl (1928) as Dean Richardson
 The Divine Lady (1929) as Honorable Charles Greville
 Prisoners (1929) as Nicholas Cathy
 Light Fingers (1929) as Light Fingers
 The Great Divide (1929) as Steven Ghent
 Prince of Diamonds (1930) as Rupert Endon
 Abraham Lincoln (1930) as John Wilkes Booth
 The Big Trail (1930) as Bill Thorpe
 The Boudoir Diplomat (1930) as Baron Belmar
 A Tailor Made Man (1931) as Dr. Von Sonntag
 The Sin Ship (1931) as Smiley Marsden
 The Phantom of Paris (1931) as Marquis Du Touchais
 Susan Lenox (1931) as Robert Lane
 The Deceiver (1931) as Reginald Thorpe
 The Sign of the Cross (1932) as Tigellinus
 Queen Christina (1933) as Magnus
 Dangerous Corner (1934) as Martin Chatfield
 Cleopatra (1934) as Octavian
 The Crusades (1935) as Saladin - Sultan of Islam
 The Three Musketeers (1935) as de Rochefort
 Don't Gamble with Love (1936) as John Crane
 The Preview Murder Mystery (1936) as E. Gordon Smith
 Mary of Scotland (1936) as James Stuart - Earl of Moray 
 White Legion (1936) as Dr. Julian Murray
 The Buccaneer (1938) as Senator Crawford
 Comet Over Broadway (1938) as Wilton Banks
 The Sea Hawk (1940) as Peralta
 All This, and Heaven Too (1940) as DeLangle
 Remember Pearl Harbor (1942) as Capt. Hudson
 Fall In (1942) as Army Doctor (uncredited)
 The Payoff (1942) as Inspector Thomas
 The Sundown Kid (1942) as J. Richard Spencer
 Corregidor (1943) as Capt. Morris
 Wild Horse Stampede (1943) as Carson
 I Escaped from the Gestapo (1943) as Gerard
 Five Graves to Cairo (1943) as Capt. St. Bride (uncredited)
 That Nazty Nuisance (1943) as Chief Paj Mab
 The Man from Thunder River (1943) as Henry Stevens
 Bordertown Gun Fighters (1943) as Cameo Shelby
 Adventures of the Flying Cadets (1943, Serial) as Col. Lee [Chs. 9-13]
 Here Comes Kelly (1943) as L. Herbert Oakley - Attorney
 Casanova in Burlesque (1944) as J. Boggs-Robinson
 Arizona Whirlwind (1944) as Polini
 The Chinese Cat (1944) as Dr. Paul Recknik
 Cowboy from Lonesome River (1944) as Matt Conway
 Bowery Champs (1944) as Ken Duncan
 Under Western Skies (1945) as Prof. Moffat
 Fog Island (1945) as Dr. Lake
 Identity Unknown (1945) as Major Williams
 Phantom of the Plains (1945) as Talbot Wilberforce Champneys aka Fancy Charlie
 Song of Old Wyoming (1945) as Lee Landow
 The Spanish Main (1945) as Captain Lussan
 Northwest Trail (1945) as Inspector McGrath
 Valley of the Zombies (1946) as Ormand Murks
 Singing on the Trail (1946) as Jerry Easton
 The Strange Woman (1946) as Lincoln Pittridge (uncredited)
 Mr. Hex (1946) as Mr. Raymond, the Hypnotist
 Dick Tracy vs. Cueball (1946) as Vitamin Flintheart
 Border Feud (1947) as Doc Peters
 Dick Tracy's Dilemma (1947) as Vitamin Flintheart
 Nightmare Alley (1947) as Pete Krumbein
 Forever Amber (1947) as Tybalt (uncredited)
 The Three Musketeers (1948) as Rochefort
 The Black Shield of Falworth (1954) as King Henry IV
 Prince of Players (1955) as Ghost of Hamlet's Father in 'Hamlet'
 New York Confidential (1955) as Waluska
 It Came from Beneath the Sea (1955) as Adm. Burns
 The Adventures of Rin Tin Tin (1955, TV) as  Roland Tarleton
 Duel on the Mississippi (1955) as Jacques Scarlet
 The Ten Commandments (1956) as Rameses I (final film)

References

External links

 
 
 Ian Keith photo gallery at New York City Public Library

1899 births
1960 deaths
American male film actors
American male silent film actors
American male stage actors
Male actors from Boston
Male actors from New York City
20th-century American male actors
Male Western (genre) film actors

 Francis W. Parker School (Chicago) alumni